Alness Academy is a secondary school in Alness, Highland in the north on the Cromarty Firth of Scotland, serving the town of Alness and the villages of Evanton and Ardross. Along with five associated primary schools, it was one of the pilot New Community Schools in the Highlands.
Originally built in the 1970s, it is one of the main schools in Ross-shire, with a school roll of 426.

Alness GeoScience STEM club came 2nd In the Junior Saltire Awards in Glasgow, June 2015. The Schools Rock Challenge group came a superb 4th place in the Rock Challenge National Final, Dundee, also in June 2015.
In June 2016 Alness Geoscience triumphed yet again winning club of the year 2016 as well as winning the WEIR 3D printed pump challenge, at the celebration of engineering and science, Glasgow science centre.

The school's resources include a sports block housing a 4 court games hall, gymnasium and 6 lane 25m pool, and a two-storey main teaching block.

The L-shaped teaching block has 14 general teaching classrooms, 6 science labs and other associated science facilities, 3 arts and ceramic classrooms, technologies & business classrooms and workshops, music & drama classrooms/practice rooms, hair & beauty salon, a traditional teaching kitchen (Home Economics) and a number of SEBN (Social, Emotional & Behavioural Needs) and ASN (Additional Support Needs) classrooms and associated facilities.

As part of the Highland Council's Sustainable School Estate Review, Alness Academy along with Invergordon Academy and several feeder primaries argued for replacement of the Alness Academy building and possible consolidation of the two secondary schools. In January 2016 funds for a new Alness building were confirmed. The government support came from £230m it had allocated to replacing or upgrading 19 schools across Scotland. The new building opened to students on 28 October 2020.

References

External links 
Alness Academy Website
Alness Academy Twitter
Alness Academy Facebook
Alness Academy on Education Scotland's ParentZone

Educational institutions established in the 1970s
Ross and Cromarty
Secondary schools in Highland (council area)